Martin Bennett Johnson (born September 9, 1985) is an American singer, songwriter and record producer. He is the frontman of the bands Boys Like Girls and the Night Game.

He has written and produced for various artists, including Avril Lavigne, Daughtry, Jason Derulo, Christina Perri, Gavin Degraw, and Hot Chelle Rae. Johnson is credited with having several RIAA-certified multi-platinum songs ("The Other Side", "Here's to Never Growing Up", "Two Is Better Than One" (with Taylor Swift), "Love Drunk", "The Great Escape," "You'll Always Find Your Way Back Home"). Songs he has written have sold over 10 million copies and he has had nine top 40 charting singles.

Personal life
Martin Johnson was born in Andover, Massachusetts on September 9, 1985 and raised in Amherst, Massachusetts. He is of English descent. He is married to singer-songwriter Naomi Cooke of the American country music group Runaway June.

Career

Boys Like Girls

Johnson is the lead singer and plays guitar for the band Boys Like Girls. The band, which consists of Johnson, Paul DiGiovanni, John Keefe, and Morgan Dorr (as of 2011) was formed in Boston, Massachusetts in 2005. Since releasing their debut album in 2006, the band has sold over a million albums and has accumulated over one hundred twenty million plays for their music on MySpace.
Johnson produced the band's latest record, Crazy World. The group is currently on hiatus and Johnson has stated the band hasn't broken up and may continue writing and recording

The Night Game

Johnson currently helms the new wave band The Night Game. The band released two singles in 2017, "The Outfield" and "Once In A Lifetime", and toured as an opening act with John Mayer. They also collaborated with Kygo on the song "Kids In Love". On February 1, 2018, The Night Game released a version of "Kids In Love" without Kygo and announced plans for a tour.

Songwriting
Johnson co-wrote, with Taylor Swift, the song "You'll Always Find Your Way Back Home" from the Hannah Montana Movie soundtrack.  Most recently, Johnson produced and co-wrote Avril Lavigne's "Here's to Never Growing Up", Jason Derulo's "The Other Side", Karmin's "Acapella", Mike Posner's "The Way It Used To Be", Gavin Degraw's "Best I Ever Had", and Christina Perri's "Human". In 2016 he collaborated with a cappella group, Pentatonix.

Selected discography
Credits primarily adapted from AllMusic.

In addition to the above-listed, Johnson (co-)wrote every track on the following Boys Like Girls albums: Boys Like Girls (2006), Love Drunk (2009), and Crazy World (2012).

References

1985 births
Living people
American rock guitarists
American male guitarists
American male singer-songwriters
Record producers from Massachusetts
Singers from Massachusetts
Songwriters from Massachusetts
People from Andover, Massachusetts
Guitarists from Massachusetts
21st-century American singers
21st-century American guitarists
21st-century American male singers